Marie-Cathérine Arnold (born 7 November 1991) is a German rower. She competed in the 2015 European Rowing Championships in Poznan winning a gold medal. At the 2016 Summer Olympics in Rio de Janeiro, she competed in the women's double sculls with teammate Mareike Adams. They finished in 7th place.

References

External links
 
 
 
 
 Marie-Cathérine Arnold at Rudern.de 

1991 births
Living people
German female rowers
World Rowing Championships medalists for Germany
Rowers at the 2016 Summer Olympics
Olympic rowers of Germany
People from Hanover Region
European Rowing Championships medalists
Sportspeople from Lower Saxony
21st-century German women
20th-century German women